Christian Church of Guangzhou Tianhe, also known as Tianhe Church, is a Christian TSPM Church in Guangzhou, China. It is located at No. 16-20 Daguan Middle Road, Tianhe District, and hence its name. It is considered the largest church in Guangzhou.

Tianhe Church is the first Christian church built in Guangzhou after 1949, and is the first church in Tianhe District. Since the church was seriously damaged, it was rebuilt in another place. On September 15, 2007, the foundation stone ceremony of the new church was held, and the construction started on February 10, 2009. It was finally opened on January 14, 2017 officially.

Architecture 
The new church was designed by Wing-ning Pang. It covers an area of 8,830 square meters, including the Main Hall, Deputy Hall, Bell Tower, Training Building and supporting management room, 5 buildings in total. The total floor area is 9,431 square meters, making it the largest-ever church in Guangzhou.

Church Activities 
The table below was entered on August 21, 2017. The content may change at any time. The actual schedule of the day shall prevail.

Gallery

References 

Tianhe District
Churches in Guangzhou
2017 establishments in China
Protestant churches in China
Churches completed in 2017
Three-Self Patriotic Movement